Rachid Driss (Arabic: الرشيد إدريس) (January 27, 1917 – September 5, 2009) was a Tunisian diplomat and writer. He held the position of the Ambassador of Tunisia to the United States, and was President of the United Nations' Social and Economic Council in 1971.

He was born in Tunis and died in Carthage, Tunisia.

References

External links
 "Adieu Rachid Driss", Jeune Afrique, September 15, 2009.

1917 births
Government ministers of Tunisia
Tunisian writers
2009 deaths
Tunisian diplomats
Writers from Tunis
Ambassadors of Tunisia to the United States